Thibault Colard (born 13 January 1992) is a French rower. He competed in the men's lightweight coxless four event at the 2016 Summer Olympics.

References

External links
 

Sportspeople from Fontainebleau
1992 births
Living people
French male rowers
Olympic rowers of France
Rowers at the 2016 Summer Olympics
Place of birth missing (living people)
Olympic bronze medalists for France
Olympic medalists in rowing
Medalists at the 2016 Summer Olympics
World Rowing Championships medalists for France
21st-century French people